With Love... from the Age of Reason is a 2010 French romantic comedy film written and directed by Yann Samuell and starring Sophie Marceau, Marton Csokas, and Michel Duchaussoy. The film is about a beautiful and successful forty-year-old businesswoman who receives a letter that she wrote to herself when she was seven years old to remind her of the promises she made at that age, which is considered to be the age of reason in the Catholic tradition, and to remind her of what she wants to become.

Plot
Margaret is a beautiful and successful businesswoman selling power plants to the Chinese. With an adoring English lover, she appears to have everything going for her. On her fortieth birthday, Margaret receives the first bundle of letters she wrote to herself when she was seven years old. A jumble of colourful collages, photographs, and wildly creative puzzles seem to have come from a different girl entirely. In a letter the seven-year-old Margaret writes, "Dear me. Today I am seven years old and I'm writing you this letter to help you remember the promises I made when I was 7, and also to remind you of what I want to become..." As her letters to herself keep arriving, Margaret finds herself becoming disenchanted. The letters evoke long-forgotten memories and cast doubt on many of the choices she made in her life. In many ways she's become the opposite of what she hoped to become as a child. Margaret visits her childhood village and, by reconnecting with people who see in her the girl they once knew, she starts finding her way to the woman she vowed to become.

Cast
 Sophie Marceau as Margaret 
 Marton Csokas as Malcolm
 Michel Duchaussoy as Mérignac
 Jonathan Zaccaï as Philibert
 Emmanuelle Grönvold as De Lorca 
 Juliette Chappey as Marguerite  
 Thierry Hancisse as Mathieu
 Roméo Lebeaut as Philibert (child)
 Jarod Legrand as Mathieu (child)
 Alexis Michalik as Margaret's assistant
 Raphaël Devedjian as Simon
 Christophe Rossignon as Huissier
 Mireille Séguret as Madame Vermier

Production
Filming locations
 Cité Scolaire Internationale de Lyon, Lyon, Rhône, Rhône-Alpes, France 
 Morocco 
 Saou, Drôme, France

References

External links
 
 
 With Love... from the Age of Reason at uniFranc

2010 films
French romantic comedy films
Belgian romantic comedy films
2010 romantic comedy films
Films directed by Yann Samuell
2010s French-language films
2010s French films